Chittenden Peak is a summit in Yosemite National Park, United States.

Chittenden Peak was named for Hiram M. Chittenden, an engineer for the Army Corps of Engineers.

References

Mountains of Tuolumne County, California
Mountains of Northern California